Ekaterina  Telesheva (1804 – 1857), was a Russian ballerina.  She was engaged at the Imperial Theatres in 1820-1842, during which she had a successful career and referred to as the elite of her profession of her generation and appointed to the rank of court dancer.

References

External links

1804 births
1857 deaths
Ballerinas from the Russian Empire
19th-century ballet dancers from the Russian Empire
Bolshoi Theatre, Saint Petersburg people